The Tira are a sub-ethnic group of the Nuba peoples in the Nuba Mountains of South Kordofan state, in southern Sudan. The population of this group exceeds 100,000.

Language
They speak Tira of the Kordofanian languages group, in the major  Niger–Congo language family. They speak Sudanese Arabic also.

See also
Index: Nuba peoples

References
Joshua Project

Nuba peoples
Ethnic groups in Sudan